John Chapman (born Charles Felix Kauffman, February 10, 1844 – September 30, 1905) was a French soldier who fought in the American Civil War. Chapman received the United States' highest award for bravery during combat, the Medal of Honor, for his action during the Battle of Sayler's Creek in Virginia on 6 April 1865. He was honored with the award on 10 May 1865.

Biography
Chapman was born in Strasbourg, France on 10 February 1844. He joined the 1st Maine Heavy Artillery from Limerick, Maine in October 1864, and was discharged in September 1865. He subsequently served in the US Navy from 1865 to 1868. Chapman died on 30 September 1905 and his remains are interred at the Holy Cross Catholic Cemetery in South San Francisco, Central California.

Medal of Honor citation

See also

List of American Civil War Medal of Honor recipients: A–F
John A. Chapman: United States Air Force Combat Controller recipient the Medal of Honor for his actions during the Battle of Takur Ghar during Operation ENDURING FREEDOM/War in Afghanistan.

References 

1844 births
1905 deaths
French-born Medal of Honor recipients
People of Maine in the American Civil War
Union Army soldiers
United States Army Medal of Honor recipients
American Civil War recipients of the Medal of Honor
People from Limerick, Maine
United States Navy sailors